Peter Anthony Delaney  (born 20 June 1939) is a retired Anglican priest of the Church of England.
 
Delaney trained for the ministry at King's College London and was ordained in 1967. He began his ordained ministry as a curate at St Marylebone Parish Church, after which he was a chaplain at the London University's Church of Christ the King. He officiated at the funeral of film star Judy Garland in June 1969. He was a residential canon and precentor of Southwark Cathedral from 1974 to 1977 and then Vicar of All Hallows-by-the-Tower in the City of London until 2004. He was the Archdeacon of London from 1999 to 2009 and has been the priest in charge of St Stephen Walbrook, also in the City, from 2005. He retired in April 2014.

In 1994-95 he was Master of the Worshipful Company of World Traders, one of the City of London's 110 livery companies.

References

1939 births
Alumni of the Theological Department of King's College London
Associates of King's College London
Archdeacons of London
Members of the Order of the British Empire
Living people